Junior Fasano is a handball club from Fasano, Italy. They currently compete in the Serie A

Team

Current squad 
Squad for the 2022–23 season

Goalkeepers
1  Simone Sibilio
12  Alessandro Leban
16  Daniele Vinci 

Wingers
RW
10  Carlo Sperti
15  Leonardo Boggia
LW 
14  Flavio Messina
19  Pablo Gastón Cantore
Line players 
5  Gianluca Grassi
44  Erik Östling
69  Raffaello Corcione 

Back players
LB
7  Filippo Angiolini
17  Marxwell Frederiksen 
23  Željko Beharević
CB 
13  Davide Notarangelo
27  Dario Petrovski 
95  Albin Järlstam
RB
2  Gabriel De Santis
11  Davide Pugliese

References

External links
 Official website
 EHF Profile

Italian handball clubs
Fasano